PHL may stand for:

 Philadelphia International Airport (IATA airport code)
 Premier Hockey League, a hockey league in India
 Pakistan Hockey League, a hockey league in Pakistan
 Pacific Hockey League, a defunct hockey league
 Professional Hockey League, a defunct hockey league in Ukraine
 The Philippines (ISO country code)
 Planet Half-Life
 30th Street Station (Amtrak station code PHL), a railroad station in Philadelphia
 Pacific Harbor Line (reporting mark PHL), a short line railroad serving the ports of Long Beach and Los Angeles 
The Planetary Habitability Laboratory, a remote laboratory for the habitability of exoplanets  
 Phl - 2,4-Diacetylphloroglucinol, a natural antibiotic produced by some Pseudomonas species

PhL or Ph.L. may stand for:  

 Philosophiae Licentiata (female) or Philosophiae Licentiatus (male), Licentiate in Philosophy